The "Doctors' plot" affair was an alleged conspiracy of prominent Soviet medical specialists to murder leading government and party officials. It was also known as the case of saboteur doctors or killer doctors. In 1951–1953, a group of predominantly Jewish doctors from Moscow were accused of a conspiracy to assassinate Soviet leaders. This was later accompanied by publications of antisemitic character in the media, which talked about the threats of Zionism and condemned people with Jewish surnames. Following this, many doctors, both Jews and non-Jews, were dismissed from their jobs, arrested, and tortured to produce admissions. A few weeks after the death of Stalin in 1953, the new Soviet leadership said there was a lack of evidence regarding the Doctors' plot and the case was dropped. Soon after, it was declared that the case had been a fabrication.

Beginnings

A number of theories attempt to explain the origins of the Doctors' plot case. Historians typically relate it to the earlier case of the Jewish Anti-Fascist Committee and to the campaign against the so-called rootless cosmopolitans in the second half of the 1940s, as well as to the power struggle within the Soviet leadership during that time. The campaign against the doctors was presumably set in motion by Stalin as a pretext to launch a massive purge of the Communist Party, and, according to Edvard Radzinsky, even to consolidate the country for a future World War III.

In 1948, an allegation was made by a Soviet veteran medical worker, Lydia Timashuk, who stated that "intentional distortions in medical conclusions [were] made by major medical experts who served as consultants in the hospital". Timashuk "exposed their criminal designs" and as such the security bodies of the Soviet Union were made aware of the existence of the alleged conspiracy against Stalin. Stalin had strong doubts about Timashuk's allegations. Stalin's daughter, Svetlana Alliluyeva, stated that her father was "very saddened by the turn of events" and that the housekeeper heard him saying that he did not believe the doctors were "dishonest" and that the only evidence against them were the reports of Timashuk.

In 1951, Ministry for State Security (MGB) investigator Mikhail Ryumin reported to his superior, Viktor Abakumov, Minister of the MGB, that Professor Yakov Etinger, who was arrested as a "bourgeois nationalist" with connections to the Jewish Anti-Fascist Committee, had committed malpractice in treating Andrei Zhdanov (died 1948) and Alexander Shcherbakov (died 1945), allegedly with the intention of killing them. However, Abakumov refused to believe the story. Etinger died in prison (2 March 1951) due to interrogations and harsh conditions. Ryumin was then dismissed from his position in the MGB for misappropriating money and was held responsible for the death of Etinger. With the assistance of Georgy Malenkov, Ryumin wrote a letter to Stalin, accusing Abakumov of killing Etinger in order to hide a conspiracy to kill off the Soviet leadership. On 4 July 1951, the Politburo set up a commission (headed by Malenkov and including Beria) to investigate the issue. Based on the commission's report, the Politburo soon passed a resolution on the "bad situation in the MGB" and Abakumov was fired.

Beria and Malenkov both tried to use the situation to expand their power through gaining control of the MGB.

Arrests

Abakumov was arrested and tortured soon after being dismissed as head of the MGB. He was charged with being a sympathizer and protector of the criminal Jewish underground. This arrest was followed by the arrests of many agents who worked for him in the central apparatus of the MGB, including most Jews.

The killer doctors case was revived in 1952 when the letter from cardiologist  was dug up from the archives. In 1948, Timashuk wrote a letter to the head of Stalin's security, General Nikolai Vlasik, explaining that Zhdanov suffered a heart attack, but the Kremlin doctors who treated him missed it and prescribed the wrong treatment for him. Zhdanov soon died and the doctors covered up their mistake. The letter, however, was originally ignored. In 1953, Timashuk was awarded the Order of Lenin (later revoked) "for the assistance in unmasking killer doctors", and for a long time Timashuk had an unjust stigma of the instigator of this persecution of doctors after Khrushchev in his "Secret Speech" mentioned her in this respect.

The Kremlin doctors involved in the cover up were to be arrested, but they were all Russian. To portray the conspiracy as Zionist, Ryumin and Semyon Ignatyev, who had succeeded Abakumov as head of the MGB, had the Jewish doctors Etinger supposedly specified also added to the arrest list; many of them, like Miron Vovsi, had been consulted by the Kremlin's medical department. The arrests started in September 1952. Vlasik was fired as head of Stalin's security and eventually also arrested for ignoring the Timashuk letter.

Initially, 37 were arrested. Under torture, prisoners seized in the investigation of the alleged plot were compelled to produce evidence against themselves and their associates.

Stalin harangued Ignatyev and accused the MGB of incompetence. He demanded that the interrogations of doctors already under arrest be accelerated. Stalin complained that there was no clear picture of the Zionist conspiracy and no solid evidence that specifically the Jewish doctors were guilty.

Newly opened KGB archives provide evidence that Stalin forwarded the collected interrogation materials to Malenkov, Khrushchev and other "potential victims of Doctors' plot".

Media campaign

Stalin ordered the news agency TASS and Pravda, the official newspaper of the CPSU, to issue reports about the uncovering of a Doctors' plot to assassinate top Soviet leaders, including Stalin himself. The possible goal of the campaign was to set the stage for show trials. Other sources say that the initiative came from Beria and Malenkov, who continued to use the plot for their own interests. Beria pushed the Politburo to decide to publicize the plot on 9 January 1953. For him, it was especially important that the Doctors' plot got more attention than the Mingrelian Affair, which personally affected him.

On January 13, 1953, nine eminent doctors in Moscow were accused of taking part in a vast plot to poison members of the top Soviet political and military leadership. Pravda reported the accusations under the headline "Vicious Spies and Killers under the Mask of Academic Physicians":
Today the TASS news agency reported the arrest of a group of saboteur-doctors. This terrorist group, uncovered some time ago by organs of state security, had as their goal shortening the lives of leaders of the Soviet Union by means of medical sabotage.

Investigation established that participants in the terrorist group, exploiting their position as doctors and abusing the trust of their patients, deliberately and viciously undermined their patients' health by making incorrect diagnoses, and then killed them with bad and incorrect treatments. Covering themselves with the noble and merciful calling of physicians, men of science, these fiends and killers dishonored the holy banner of science. Having taken the path of monstrous crimes, they defiled the honor of scientists.

Among the victims of this band of inhuman beasts were Comrades A. A. Zhdanov and A. S. Shcherbakov. The criminals confessed that, taking advantage of the illness of Comrade Zhdanov, they intentionally concealed a myocardial infarction, prescribed inadvisable treatments for this serious illness and thus killed Comrade Zhdanov. Killer doctors, by incorrect use of very powerful medicines and prescription of harmful regimens, shortened the life of Comrade Shcherbakov, leading to his death.

The majority of the participants of the terrorist group… were bought by American intelligence. They were recruited by a branch-office of American intelligence – the international Jewish  bourgeois-nationalist organization called "Joint." The filthy face of this Zionist spy organization, covering up their vicious actions under the mask of charity, is now completely revealed…

Unmasking the gang of poisoner-doctors struck a blow against the international Jewish Zionist organization.... Now all can see what sort of philanthropists and "friends of peace" hid beneath the sign-board of "Joint."

Other participants in the terrorist group (Vinogradov, M. Kogan, Egorov) were discovered, as has been presently determined, to have been long-time agents of English intelligence, serving it for many years, carrying out its most criminal and sordid tasks. The bigwigs of the USA and their English junior partners know that to achieve domination over other nations by peaceful means is impossible. Feverishly preparing for a new world war, they energetically send spies inside the USSR and the people's democratic countries: they attempt to accomplish what the Hitlerites could not do — to create in the USSR their own subversive "fifth column."...

The Soviet people should not for a minute forget about the need to heighten their vigilance in all ways possible, to be alert for all schemes of war-mongers and their agents, to constantly strengthen the Armed Forces and the intelligence organs of our government.

Other individuals mentioned included:

 Solomon Mikhoels (actor-director of the Moscow State Jewish Theater and the head of the Jewish Anti-Fascist Committee, assassinated in January 1948), who was called a "well-known Jewish bourgeois nationalist"
 Miron Vovsi (therapist, Stalin's personal physician and a cousin of Mikhoels)
  (therapist), also a personal doctor to Stalin
 Mikhail Kogan (therapist)
 Boris Kogan (therapist)
 P. Yegorov (therapist)
 A. Feldman (otolaryngologist)
 Yakov Etinger (therapist)
  (neuropathologist)
 G. Mayorov (therapist)

Six of the nine mentioned doctors were Jewish.

The list of alleged victims included high-ranked officials Andrei Zhdanov,  Aleksandr Shcherbakov, Army Marshals Aleksandr Vasilevsky, Leonid Govorov and Ivan Konev, General Sergei Shtemenko, Admiral Gordey Levchenko and others.

Stalin intended to publish in Pravda a letter signed by many prominent Soviet Jews in which the Jews involved in the plot would be denounced, and differences between them and other Soviet Jews (those loyal to the USSR and to socialism) would be made clear. Two versions of the letter were created, but it was never published. Either Stalin eventually decided not to publish it or it was still being worked on at the time of his death.

Stalin's death and the consequences
After Stalin's death on March 5, 1953, the new leadership quickly dismissed all charges related to the plot; the doctors were exonerated in a March 31 decree by the newly appointed Minister of Internal Affairs, Lavrentiy Beria, and on April 6, this was communicated to the public in Pravda. Chief MGB investigator and Deputy Minister of State Security Mikhail Ryumin was accused of fabricating the plot, arrested and later executed. A Komsomol official, Nikolai Mesyatsev, was assigned by Malenkov to review the Doctors' plot case and quickly found that it was fabricated.

Khrushchev's statements
In his 1956 "Secret Speech", First Secretary Nikita Khrushchev stated that the Doctors' plot was "fabricated... set up by Stalin," but that Stalin did not "have the time in which to bring it to an end," which saved the doctors' lives. Khrushchev also told the session that Stalin called the judge in the case and, regarding the methods to be used, stated "beat, beat and, beat again." Stalin supposedly told his Minister of State Security, "If you do not obtain confessions from the doctors we will shorten you by a head."

Khrushchev also claimed that Stalin hinted to him to incite antisemitism in Ukraine, saying, "The good workers at the factory should be given clubs so they can beat the hell out of those Jews." "Factory workers" armed with clubs were used in the Stalinist secret police operation known as the Kielce pogrom of 1946, overseen by GRU officer Mikhail Diomin – one of a coordinated series of pogroms across Eastern Europe.

According to Khrushchev, Stalin told Politburo members, "You are blind like young kittens. What will happen without me? The country will perish because you do not know how to recognize enemies."

Khrushchev asserted that Stalin intended to use the doctors' trial to launch a massive purge of the Communist Party.

Alleged planned deportation of Jews
There is a view, based on various memoirs and secondary evidence, that the Doctors' plot case was intended to trigger the mass repression and deportation of the Jews to the Jewish Autonomous Oblast, similar to the deportations of many other ethnic minorities in the Soviet Union, but the plan was not accomplished because of the sudden death of Stalin.

According to Louis Rapoport the alleged deportation was planned to start with the public execution of the imprisoned doctors, and then the "following incidents would follow": "attacks on Jews orchestrated by the secret police, the publication of the statement by the prominent Jews, and a flood of other letters demanding that action be taken. A three-stage program of genocide would be followed. First, almost all Soviet Jews ... would be shipped to camps east of the Urals ... Second, the authorities would set Jewish leaders at all levels against one another ... Also the MGB [Secret Police] would start killing the elites in the camps, just as they had killed the Yiddish writers ... the previous year. The ... final stage would be to 'get rid of the rest.'"

Four large camps were built in southern and western Siberia shortly before Stalin's death in 1953, and there were rumors that they were for Jews. A special "Deportation Commission" to plan the deportation of Jews to these camps was allegedly created. Nikolay Poliakov, the presumed secretary of the "Commission", stated years later that, according to Stalin's initial plan, the deportation was to begin in the middle of February 1953, but the monumental tasks of compiling lists of Jews had not yet been completed. "Pure blooded" Jews were to be deported first, followed by "half-breeds" (polukrovki). Before his death in March 1953, Stalin allegedly had planned the execution of Doctors' plot defendants already on trial in Red Square in March 1953, and then he would cast himself as the savior of Soviet Jews by sending them to camps away from the purportedly enraged Russian populace. There are further statements that describe some aspects of such a planned deportation.

Yakov Etinger described how former CPSU Politburo member Nikolai Bulganin said that Stalin asked him in the end of February 1953 to prepare railroad cars for the mass deportation of Jews to the Jewish Autonomous Oblast. According to a book by another Soviet Politburo member Alexander Yakovlev, Stalin started preparations for the deportation of Jews in February 1953 and ordered preparation of a letter from a group of notable Soviet Jews with a request to the Soviet government to carry out the mass deportation of Jews in order to save them from "the just wrath of Soviet people." The letter had to be published in the newspaper Pravda and was found later. According to historian Samson Madiyevsky, the deportation was definitely considered, and the only thing in question is the time-frame.

According to Zhores Medvedev, no documents were found in support of the deportation plan.

See also
 History of the Jews in Russia and Soviet Union
 Khrustalyov, My Car!
 Night of the Murdered Poets
 Prague Trials
 Stalin and antisemitism

Notes

References

General references

Further reading 
 .
 .
 .

External links 

 .
 .
 .
 .
 .
 .
 

Antisemitism in the Soviet Union
Anti-Zionism in the Soviet Union
Political repression in the Soviet Union
1952 in the Soviet Union
1953 in the Soviet Union
Political and cultural purges
Soviet phraseology
Health in the Soviet Union
Antisemitic canards
1953 in Judaism
Conspiracy theories involving Jews
1953 in Moscow
1952 in Moscow
Abandoned expulsions of Jews